Miss Willie Brown was an American country music duo consisting of Amanda Watkins and Kasey Buckley, who are respectively natives of West Virginia and Texas but met in California. They are signed to A&M/Octone Records, to which they were the first group signed.

The duo performed on Jimmy Kimmel Live! in 2011 before their signing. Afterward, they began working with producer Keith Stegall on their debut album. They also toured with Dierks Bentley and Josh Thompson and released a self-titled extended play. Debut single "Sick of Me" did not enter the charts, but its followup, "You're All That Matters to Me", was made into a music video and charted in August 2012. Miss Willie Brown performed "You're All That Matters to Me" and "Sick of Me" on The CW's Hart of Dixie on April 9, 2012 in the episode "Always on My Mind".

On April 16, 2013, the duo announced on their Facebook page that they were dissolving the group with Watkins pursuing a solo career and Buckley taking a break from music.

Discography

Extended plays

Singles

Music videos

References

A&M Records artists
Country music groups from Tennessee
Country music duos
Musical groups from Nashville, Tennessee
Musical groups established in 2011
Musical groups disestablished in 2013
2011 establishments in Tennessee